Gynoxys chagalensis is a species of flowering plant in the family Asteraceae. It is found only in Ecuador. Its natural habitat is subtropical or tropical moist montane forests. It is threatened by habitat loss.

References

chagalensis
Flora of Ecuador
Endangered plants
Taxonomy articles created by Polbot